"Live Wire" is the debut single by the American heavy metal band Mötley Crüe. It was released on their 1981 debut album Too Fast for Love.

Overview
The video was directed by the members of Mötley Crüe. It showcases the band's stage theatrics, such as Nikki Sixx setting himself on fire (due to lack of money to perform on stage pyrotechnics) and Mick Mars drooling blood. The single was released on August 16, 1982. In May 2006, it was ranked #17 on VH1's list of the 40 greatest metal songs of all time.

The song was remixed in 1991 alongside "Piece of Your Action" for the compilation album Decade of Decadence.

Cover versions
In 2000, fellow heavy metal band Fozzy covered this song for their debut self-titled album. Swedish hardcore punk band Refused included a cover in their The Demo Compilation. In 2010, Japanese rock band Vamps covered it as the B-side to their single "Devil Side". Meghan Kabir recorded a slow version of the song for Mötley Crüe's 2019 biopic The Dirt.

In 2014, The Cadillac Three covered the song on Nashville Outlaws: A Tribute to Mötley Crüe released via Big Machine Records.

Personnel
 Vince Neil – lead vocals
 Mick Mars – guitars, backing vocals
 Nikki Sixx – bass, backing vocals
 Tommy Lee – drums, backing vocals

In popular culture
"Live Wire" appears in the soundtracks to the video games Tony Hawk's American Wasteland, Brütal Legend, Saints Row: The Third, and NBA 2K20. The song also appears on the soundtrack to Charlie's Angels. It also appears in the Netflix original film The Dirt which is about Mötley Crüe's history.

Charts

References

1981 songs
Mötley Crüe songs
Songs written by Nikki Sixx
Speed metal songs
1982 debut singles